Charles Marchant Stevenson (August 29, 1927 – August 30, 2004) was an American artist.

Biography

Early life and education
Stevenson was born to Mildred and Charles Marchant Stevenson II in Washington, D.C.. He spent his early years at his family home in Maryland. 

He was awarded a scholarship to the adult school of the Corcoran Academy of Fine Art in Washington, D.C., which he attended from 1938 until 1945, when, immediately after his eighteenth birthday, Stevenson enlisted in the United States Navy. In the Navy, Stevenson worked on service publications, as an illustrator for All Hands and as art director for Naval Training and Training Bulletin. 

After his tour of duty, Stevenson studied in Philadelphia, at the Pennsylvania Academy of the Fine Arts and the University of Pennsylvania.

Stevenson's early jobs included church window design at the Paine-Speyers stained glass company, work as an attendant and art therapist in a mental hospital, and as an advertising artist for several department stores.

Relocation to San Francisco 
In 1954, Stevenson moved from the East Coast to San Francisco. There he worked for the advertising agency Wyatt & Welch for several years before leaving for free-lance work as a  muralist and portrait painter. From 1957 to 1961, Stevenson ran Stevenson Graphics, a San Francisco advertising agency with ten commercial artists.

Examples of Stevenson's artwork from this period include Charles Marchant Stevenson: Self Portrait (1960) and The Goat Lady's House(1960), a painting of Lyford House, Richardson Bay Audubon Center & Sanctuary., built in the 1870s, now a Registered Historical Landmark, part of the  Richardson Bay Audubon Center & Sanctuary and open to the public.

Relocation to Mendocino
Stevenson closed Stevenson Graphics in 1961 and left San Francisco for the village of Mendocino, California, which he made his home until his death. Of his radical change in location and lifestyle, Stevenson said, "Years ago a fortune teller told me that I had a chance to remake my entire life and I said, 'What I'd really like is to find someplace like Carmel or Monterey was when all the artists and writers were there,' and she said, 'Mendocino!'" 

Just arrived in Mendocino, Stevenson phoned artist Dorr Bothwell who introduced him to Mendocino Art Center founders Bill and Jennie Zacha; that night the Zachas fed Stevenson dinner and rented him a studio behind their house. To earn money, at first Stevenson did architectural drafting for Bill Zacha, then worked part-time at several local restaurants.

Mendocino Art Center 
Subsequently, Bill Zacha offered Stevenson a position teaching at the Mendocino Art Center, where Stevenson taught for almost forty years. In addition, Zacha represented Stevenson at Zacha's Bay Window Gallery.

Inspired by private schools of art on the East Coast, in the mid-1970s Stevenson created and was the first director of the Mastership Program at the Mendocino Art Center, an accredited alternative art school for children and teens. Instructors included James Maxwell (life drawing), Miriam Rice (sculpture), Ray Rice (murals and animation), Charles Stevenson (painting), and  Bill Zacha (watercolor). Outside the classroom, Bill Zacha was the school's administrator and Dorr Bothwell acted as advisor.

The Stevenson Studio at the Mendocino Art Center was donated by Mildred and Charles Marchant Stevenson II, the artist's parents.

In 1976 Stevenson donated a large parcel of land to the Mendocino Art Center. Stevenson sold the property, located on Little Lake Street between School and Howard Streets, for one dollar, with the provision that it be used for affordable housing for artists. In 2006 the property was sold to a private developer for 1.2 million dollars.

Stevenson-Leach Studios
In 1989, Stevenson invited young Mendocino artist Matt Leach first to be his apprentice, then to work with him as a partner; they formed Stevenson/Leach Studios. Among the works produced by the team were a series of large painted screens, of which Mendocino Afterglow is a strong example. The Artist's Magazine awarded Mendocino Afterglow first place in its 1995 international landscape competition.

Theatre
Both Stevenson and Leach worked in local theatre, designing sets and posters for local productions, including productions at the Mendocino Art Center's Helen Schoeni Theatre, currently administered by the Mendocino Theatre Company, and the Gloriana Opera Company (now Gloriana Musical Theatre). Stevenson directed plays as well.

Final years
In Stevenson's later years, he and his friend, artist Pamela Hunter, held salons at Stevenson's house in the village of Mendocino — open gatherings of local artists, writers, and musicians, with art exhibits, poetry readings, and performances by local musicians. 

After a long illness, Stevenson died at home the day after his 77th birthday, August 30, 2004.

Art practice

Media
For his large work, Stevenson preferred acrylic paint, sometimes on canvas or canvas board, but more often on wood or masonite panels, which he prepared for painting with a ground of gessoed cheesecloth, a technique Stevenson developed painting for theatre. Referring to Stevenson's paintings, Maureen Eppstein wrote, "In some the richness of texture is enhanced by the surface under the paint, layers of gesso and loosely woven cheesecloth..." In addition to acrylics, Stevenson worked in serigraphy, watercolor, gouache and pen and ink drawing.

Portraits
Initially, Stevenson's work focused on his distinctive multiple-image portraits, for example Bata Bheag: Portrait of Irving S. Shapiro (1968), Mendocino Shepherd: Portrait of Thorkild Thompson (1967) and Dorr (1964), Stevenson's portrait of Dorr Bothwell at work in her Mendocino studio.

Although Stevenson always painted portraits, in the early 1970s he became more selective in accepting commissions and began to focus on other genres; his interests were wide and most are reflected in his subject matter.

Golden ratio and "Sparles"
Stevenson based his compositions on the golden ratio, first referred to by Leonardo da Vinci as the secto aurea (golden section). Leonardo's line drawings of the five Platonic solids illustrate Luca Pacioli's book La Divina Proportione (1509). One of Stevenson's reference books on the subject was Elements of Dynamic Symmetry by Jay Hambidge.

Stevenson's post-1961 work often included dynamic fractures inspired by Pythagoras' "theory of spiraling forms, serial dynamic symmetry" patterns which Stevenson said compose "the webwork of energy that extends everywhere.", illustrated in Apotheosis of the Working Man (1993), As I See It: Mendocino Bay (1995) and Stevenson's double portrait of jazz poet Ruth Weiss and artist Paul Blake, The Poet & The Artist (2002). Originally Stevenson called the star-like figures which emerged in spiraling fractures, "sparkles", but an interviewer's typo changed the word to "sparles" and Stevenson adopted it.

Liturgical work
Although Stevenson was eclectic in his personal spiritual exploration, with a special interest in Hermetic philosophy, some of Stevenson's Christian liturgical work can be seen at several Northern California churches. The stained glass angel windows at Saint Michael & All Angels Episcopal Church, Fort Bragg, California, were designed by Stevenson and installed in 1984. Other church installations include Stevenson's murals at the Methodist Church of the Good Shepherd (now Good Shepherd United Methodist Church), Richmond, California, and the Piedmont Community Church, Piedmont, California. In a rare foray into sculpture, Stevenson designed the altar cross for the children's chapel at the Piedmont Community Church.

Book illustration
Those who are familiar with the work of musician, writer and cultural icon Chester Anderson will recognize Charles Stevenson as the illustrator of Anderson's groundbreaking proto-graphic novel Fox & Hare: The Story of a Friday Evening (1980), published by Paul Williams' Entwhistle Books. 

Lately I've Been Thinking (1990), one of the  Mendocino Malady series by Bobby Markels, is illustrated on the cover and throughout the text with Stevenson's line drawings of the author. 

Stevenson's painting The Hee Ancestor Landing on the Headlands appears on the cover of the Kelley House Museum publication Chinese of the Mendocino Coast, by Dorothy Bear and David Houghton.

Exhibitions 
A Charles M. Stevenson retrospective was held at the Mendocino Art Center in 1994.

References

Notes

Sources 

 Anderson, Chester. Charles Stevenson, illustrator. Fox & Hare: the story of a Friday evening. Entwhistle Books. Glen Ellen, California, 1980. Print.
 "Archive of the Art of Charles Marchant Stevenson". Accessed 05-30-2010. Web.
 "Artist's Magazine '95 Art Competition: Landscapes, First Place: Charles Stevenson and Matthew Leach: Capturing Passing Time." The Artist's Magazine, Fall & Winter, 1995. Page 66. Print.
 Arvola, K. Andarin, "The Magic of Charles M. Stevenson: August 29, 1927 - August 30, 2004",  Real Estate Magazine: Mendocino Property, Vol. 18, No. 8, Issue 450. Pages 1–4. Print.
 Arvola, Andarin, "The Magic of Charles M. Stevenson: August 29, 1927 - August 30, 2004",  Real Estate Magazine, Editorial 450 for Printing. Accessed 11-14-2009. Web.
 Bear, Dorothy & Houghton, David."Chinese of the Mendocino Coast", Mendocino Historical Review, Volume XV. Winter/Spring 1990-1991. Kelley House Museum (original name of publisher: Mendocino Historical Research), P.O. Box 922, Mendocino, California. Print.
 Bear, Dorothy & Houghton, David. The Temple of Kwan Tai. Excerpts from The Chinese of the Mendocino Coast. Mendocino Historical Review, Volume XV Winter/Spring. The Kelley House Museum, publisher. 1990-1991. Accessed 06-13-2010. Web.
 Blick, Carol Goodwin, "Charles Stevenson (1927-2004)". 2008. Accessed 06-13-2010. Web.
 Brossard, Chandler. Ted Streshinsky, photographer. "California Village: A Young Man Saves an Old Town", Look Magazine. September 25, 1962. Accessed 06-10-2010. Web.
De Vall, Norman. "The Mendocino Art Center", Mendocino Arts, The Mendocino Art Center, Mendocino, California 95460. Summer 2006. Page 18. Print.
 Good Shepherd United Methodist Church, formerly Methodist Church of the Good Shepherd, 6226 Arlington Boulevard,  Richmond, California. Accessed 06-28-2010. Web.
 Hambidge, Jay. Elements of Dynamic Symmetry. Dover Books on Art Instruction. 1967. 133 pages. Print.
 Hee-Chorley, Lorraine. Chinese In Mendocino County. Arcadia Publishing. Mount Pleasant, South Carolina. 2009. Print.
 Review, "Chinese in Mendocino County" by Lorraine Hee-Chorley, Arcadia Publishing, Mount Pleasant, South Carolina. Accessed 06-12-2010. Web.
 Huckaby, Gerry. "Charles Stevenson: The Nature of Reality." A&E Magazine. August 1994. Mendocino Art Center. Mendocino, California. Pages 4–6. Print.
 Kelley House Museum, 45007 Albion Street, Mendocino, California, 95460. Accessed 06-13-2010. Web.
 Kjeldsen, Beverley Baker, "Mendocino Art Center's 35th Anniversary: Bill Zacha Builds an Art Center", Arts & Entertainment Magazine The Mendocino Art Center, Mendocino, California, Vol.XIX, No. 8. August 1994. Pages 8–10. Print.
 Korbel, Connie. "Art Center Denied Extension: Must Reapply For Water Permit", Mendocino Beacon. 07-06-2006 Page 1. Print
 Korbel, Connie. "Harvest at Mendosa's Secures More Water", Mendocino Beacon. 01-04-2007. Page 1. Print.
 Lamb, Antonia. "Interview: Charles Stevenson", A&E Magazine. December 6, 1990 . Mendocino Art Center. Mendocino, California 95460. Print.
 Leach, Matt with Lamb, Antonia. "Interview: Charles Stevenson, Master Painter", A&E Magazine. Mendocino Art Center, Mendocino, California, 95460. August 1994. Pages 5–7, 22-23. Print.
Leach, Matt, The Art of Charles M. Stevenson, Mendocino, California Accessed 06-13-2010. Web.
 Levene, Bruce, compiler & editor. The Mendocino Art Center: A 50 Year Retrospective. Pacific Transcriptions, Mendocino, California 95460. 2009. . Print.
 Lyford House at Richardson Bay Audubon Center & Sanctuary. Tiburon, California. Accessed 06-13-2010. Web.
 Markels, Bobby. "Quotes by Bobby Markels", GoodReads. Accessed 06-13-2010. Web.
 Markels, Bobby. Lately I've Been Thinking. Charles Stevenson, illustrator. Saul Bellow and Anne Halley, comments on back cover. Stone Publishing Company, P.O. Box 711, Mendocino, California 95460. 1990. Print.
 Markels, Bobby. "Lately I've Been Thinking", Mendocino Malady: The Complete Collection, 1966 - 2006. Cypress House.  . Print.
 Mendocino Art Center, 45200 Little Lake Street, Mendocino, California, 95460. Accessed 06-14-2010. Web.
 Mendocino Community Services District, minutes of the meeting, July 28, 2008. Accessed 11-16-2009. Web.
 Miller, Rebecca. John Birchard & Justin Lewis, photographers. Judy Dietrick, book designer. "Charles Stevenson", Mendocino Artists: An Endangered Species. North Coast Rural Challenge and Mendocino County Museum in collaboration with Monday Press, Palo Alto, California. 2000. Unpaged. Print.
 Obara, Samuel. "Golden Ratio in Art and Architecture", The University of Georgia, Department of Mathematics Education. Accessed 06-28-2010. Web.
 Pacioli, Luca. "Divina Proportione"  Nabu Press. 2010. . Print.
 Pertha, Hilda. "Drawing with Charles Stevenson",  A&E Magazine  The Mendocino Art Center, Mendocino, California. Summer 2002. Pages 27, 75. Reprinted with permission. Originally published in WESTART, May 1975. Print.
 Piedmont Community Church, 400 Highland Avenue, Piedmont, California. Accessed 06-10-2010. Web.
 Richardson Bay Audubon Center & Sanctuary. Tiburon, California. Accessed 06-13-2010. Web.
Saint Michael & All Angels Episcopal Church, Fort Bragg, California. Accessed 06-13-2010. Web.
 Saint Michael & All Angels Episcopal Church 201 E. Fir Street, Fort Bragg, California 95437. Accessed 06-13-2010. Web.
 Stevenson, Charles. Antonia Lamb, editor. "Local Artists on Avant Garde: Charles Stevenson talks about the onward march of culture and other things related to the avant garde", Arts & Entertainment Magazine. The Mendocino Art Center, Mendocino, California 95460. March 1981. Pages 8–9. Print.
 Stevenson/Leach Studios. Accessed 06-28-2010. Web
 The Temple of Kwan Tai, 54160 Albion Street, Mendocino, California. Accessed 06-10-2010. Web.
 Wallace, Kent & Roberson, Robyn. "In Dreams Begin Responsibilities: The Saga of Bill Zacha and the Mendocino Art Center", OutLook (formerly Mendocino County Outlook). August 1994. Page 14. Print.
 Williams, Paul. "Introduction", Fox and Hare: The Story of A Friday Evening. Entwhistle Books, Glen Ellen, California 95442. Chester Anderson, author. Charles Stevenson, illustrator. 1980. Print.
 Zacha, Bill. "I've Been Looking For This Town All My Life: an Oral History",The Mendocino Art Center: A 50 Year Retrospective. Pacific Transcriptions, Mendocino, California 95460. 2009. . Print.
 Zacha, Bill, "The Nurturing Love", Arts & Entertainment Magazine,  Vol. XIX, No. 8. The Mendocino Art Center, Mendocino, California, 95460. August 1994. Page 11. Print.
 Zacha, Lucia. "Divine Inspiration, Creative Genius. A Whim.", Mendocino Arts.  The Mendocino Art Center, Mendocino, California 95460. Fall 2010. Page 11. Print.

1927 births
2004 deaths
20th-century American painters
American male painters
21st-century American painters
21st-century American male artists
People from Mendocino, California
20th-century American male artists